Valley is a census-designated place and unincorporated community in Stevens County, Washington, United States. In the 2010 census the population was 146.

The town of Valley was named by Daniel C. Corbin. Mr. Corbin named the town Valley, because it is at the entrance to the Colville Valley. The Spokane Falls and Northern Railway was connected to Valley in 1889. D. C.Corbin set up a small building for a depot.

Most inhabitants of the area were across the valley to the west of the river near the Fort Walla Walla Fort Colville Military Road. Few came to the east side, where current Valley is located, due to the swampy areas around the river. The oldest home in Valley was built in 1885 by the Jarvis family. John C. Jarvis was the first postmaster of Valley from December 1889 to November 1893.

George Kulzer came to Valley in 1889 and built a store, Kulzer and Son. In 1908, fire destroyed the store, saloon, and livery stable. The store was rebuilt and continues to stand today. George Kulzer built a corduroy road across the valley towards Waitts Lake.

Valley was first platted 29 July 1891. In the early days, Valley had its own bank, electric generator plant, phone company, water company and feed mill, two hotels, a drug store and blacksmith shop.

Valley has a post office with ZIP code 99181.

Valley has an annual fair, the second Saturday of August. The emphasis is on creating an "old fashioned family atmosphere," and encouraging children and youth to learn and practice traditional craft, baking, and preservation skills.

References

Census-designated places in Stevens County, Washington
Unincorporated communities in Washington (state)
Census-designated places in Washington (state)
Unincorporated communities in Stevens County, Washington